Halebank railway station was a railway station between Liverpool and Widnes, England.

History 
The station opened on 1 July 1852 as Halewood and was renamed Halebank for Hale on 3 October 1874. The line through the station was quadrupled in 1891. The station name was simplified to Halebank in May 1895. The station was temporarily closed between 1 January 1917 and 5 May 1919. It was closed permanently on 15 September 1958.

References

Disused railway stations in the Metropolitan Borough of Knowsley
Former London and North Western Railway stations
Railway stations in Great Britain opened in 1852
Railway stations in Great Britain closed in 1958
1852 establishments in England